Mariyam Khalif (Urdu:  مریم خلیف) also known as Maryam, is a Pakistani Child-Star who started her acting career on the television drama Parchayian aired on ARY Digital. Mariyam Khalif was born on 11 April 2007, At the age of only seven years she got fame and got a chance to work in many other Pakistani dramas. She also worked in a couple of TV commercials for most products and brands. Currently she is appearing in one of the most famous Geo TV dramas Bashar Momin as Pareezah, while also in another famous drama serial Koi Nahi Apna on ARY Digital as Shiza. Her most popular role is of young Farah in Diyar-e-Dil later played by Maya Ali.

Career 
Mariyam Khalif at the age of 7, she got fame and got a chance to work in many other Pakistani dramas after a vital role in thetelevision drama Parchayian. She also worked in a couple of TV Commercials for most of products and brands. She appears in of the Geo TV drama Bashar Momin, while also in another drama serial Koi Nahi Apna on ARY Digital.

Role in Bashar Momin 
Bashar Momin seems to be the first Pakistani Drama hitting the Indian Television Screen due to its explicit genres of jealousy, love, hatred, romance and suspense. Mariyam Khalif is playing the role of Parizay in Bashar Momin who is the only child of Adil Yasir Mazhar and Sahira Maheen Rizvi. She was first appeared in second episode of Bashar Momin and her acting was flawless.

Role in Koi Nahi Apna 

Koi Nahi Apna is actually the story of a couple who are very happy in the start and later on due to some pressure of daily life, their family is destroyed by suspicion. Mariyam Khalif is playing the role of Shiza who is the only daughter of Hamza (Fahad Mustafa) and Alveera (Sarwat Gillani).

Role in Meri Beti 

Meri Beti was recently on aired on ARY Digital, the drama was actually based on the relation of Mother and Daughter. Mariyam Khalif played the role of Iraj in the initial episodes while she was a child. Later when viewers were taken 7 years ahead in the play then the rold of Iraj was played by Arij Fatyma another talented actress of Pakistani Dramas. It will not be wrong to say that the role of Mariyam Khalif being a child star was tremendous.

TV commercials 

 Q-Mobile G-200
Mariyam Khalif was recently seen in a TV Commercial which was made for Q-Mobile G-200. The appearance of Child-Stars especial Mariyam Khalif playing adult roles was giving a cute impression and it is not wrong to say that she have performed flawless in this TV Commercial

Television

Films 
 Shab-e-Zulmat as Guriya (Dead)

TV commercials

See also 

 Bashar Momin
 Dil Ka Kia Rang Karun
 Karb
 Diyar-e-Dil

External links

References 

2007 births
Living people
21st-century Pakistani actresses
Pakistani child actresses
Pakistani television actresses
Actresses from Karachi